The Louis Comfort Tiffany Foundation was founded in 1918 by Louis Comfort Tiffany to operate his estate, Laurelton Hall, in Cold Spring Harbor, Long Island. It was designed to be a summer retreat for artists and craftspeople. In 1946 the estate closed and the foundation changed its purpose from a retreat to the bestowing of grants to artists.

In closing down her father's residence after his death, George Frederick Kunz' daughter, Ruby Zinsser, donated two paintings by Louis C. Tiffany to the Tiffany Foundation. "In 1935, the family of George F. Kunz donated two Tiffany paintings to the picture gallery." In this, she was following her father's inclination, since he had previously donated a Syrian bracelet and mineral collection to the Foundation in 1928.

Notable fellowship award recipients 

 Guy Anderson, American painter from the Northwest School
 Marco Brambilla, Italian-born Canadian contemporary artist and film director
 Nicole Cherubini, American visual artist and ceramicist
 Mario Cooper, American watercolor painter and sculptor 1949
 Marsha Cottrell, American artist
 Alfred Crimi, American muralist and painter
 Moyra Davey, New York-based artist specializing in photography, video and writing
 Arthur Deshaies, American artist and printmaker
 Janet Doub Erickson, for textile design in 1955, blockprinter, founder of the Blockhouse of Boston, and author
 John Drury (1997), New York City
 Herbert Ferber (1930), New York City-based Abstract Expressionism sculptor
 Teresita Fernández, New York City-based artist
 Ann Gardner, American glass artist, mosaicist, and installation artist
 Adam Helms, American artist based in Brooklyn, New York
 Evan Holloway, artist based in Los Angeles.
 Luise Clayborn Kaish, American artist known for her work in sculpture, painting, and collage
 Karen LaMonte, artist.
 Ciel Bergman, then known as Cheryl Bowers, an American painter.
 Dante Marioni, American glass artist, work featured in the National Museum of Art, Renwick Gallery 
 Josiah McElheny, artist/sculptor, award winner of the Foundation's 1995 Biennial Competition
 Paul Meltsner, WPA era painter and muralist
 George Joseph Mess, a 1931 award recipient, was an American painter, printmaker, commercial artist, and art educator based in Indianapolis, Indiana
 Veraldo J. Cariani, Brown County, Indiana and Massachusetts Painter, 1920.
 Wardell Milan, New York based artist
 Marilyn Minter, painter and photographer
 Eric Norstad, Northern California ceramicist and architect
 Rinaldo Paluzzi, American/Spanish painter and sculptor
 Mavis Pusey, American abstract painter
 Francis J. Quirk, American painter, 1932
 Andrew Raftery, American engraver and painter. Recipient of Louis Comfort Tiffany Award in 2003.
 Edna Reindel, American painter, illustrator, sculptor, and muralist. Recipient of Fellowship in 1926 and 1932
 Noel Rockmore, American painter from New York City and New Orleans. Recipient of Fellowship in 1956 and 1963
 Concetta Scaravaglione, sculptress in New York. Recipient of Fellowship in 1928
 Larry Sultan, American photographer 
 Marc Trujillo, North American artist/painter
 Anne Wilson, Chicago-based interdisciplinary artist

References

External links 

 Louis Comfort Tiffany and Laurelton Hall: an artist's country estate, an exhibition catalog from The Metropolitan Museum of Art Libraries (fully available online as PDF), which contains material on the Foundation

Arts organizations based in New York (state)
Arts foundations based in the United States
Arts organizations established in 1918
1918 establishments in New York (state)